Trollkyrka ("Troll's church") is a secluded butte-like rock in the heart of the National Park of Tiveden, Sweden, which served as a pagan sacrificial ground (horgr, see also blót) for centuries after Christianity became the dominant religion in Scandinavia. It may have been used as late as the 19th century, when popular tradition still held the mountain to be off-limits for Christians.

According to Lidman (1972:52) old people used to say: "No Christian can go there. The mountains of the troll church belong to the heathen trolls. If a Christian ventures there, he will come to grief."

In fact, local tradition relates that the mountain was used not long ago for heathen rites and that anyone who was not initiated and saw it risked either to be buried in a bog in the forest or sworn into the brotherhood. These precautions clearly indicate that the rites took place as late as the period 1604–1735, which was a time when there was a penalty of death on practising such rituals. The rites are described in a folk poem documented by the folklorist Carshult (1941) when he documented the traditions on Skaga stave church. It has later been published in Karlsson (1970:62) and Lidman (1972:52).

See also
Blót

References
Carshult, B.G. (1941) Undenäsbygden genom tiderna.
Karlsson, S. (1970) I Tiveden, Reflex, Mariestad.
Lidman, H. (1972) Gudanatt, dagar och nätter i Tiveden, Askild & Kärnekull, Stockholm.

External links
 The Trollkyrka Folk-Poem 

Scandinavian folklore
Norse paganism
Religious places